Loving Feeling is a 1968 British sex comedy-drama film directed by Norman J. Warren and starring Simon Brent, Georgina Ward and Paula Patterson.

Premise
Steve, a womanising DJ, wants to get back with his wife Suzanne, from whom he is separated. Obstacles to the reunion include Suzanne's new love, Scott, and Steve's affairs with a secretary, Carol, Carol's flatmate and a French model.

Cast

 Simon Brent as Steve Day
 Georgina Ward as Suzanne Day
 Paula Patterson as Carol Taylor
 John Railton as Scott Fisher
 Françoise Pascal as Model
 Heather Kyd as Christine Johnson
 Peter Dixon as Philip Peterson
 Carol Cunningham as Jane Butler
 Jacky Allouis as Helen
 John Aston as Jane's boyfriend
 Richard Bartlett as Sound mixer
 Sonya Benjamin as Belly dancer
 Paul Endesby as Old man on beach
 Stanley Folb as Press photographer
 Robert Hewison as Radio producer
 Allen John as Restaurant manager
 Mary Land as Girl
 Barry Stephens as Chauffeur
 Penny Watts as Girl

Production

Filming
The film was shot at Isleworth Studios with sets designed by the art director Hayden Pearce.

Release

Critical response
The film was negatively received by David Wilson of The Monthly Film Bulletin, who described it as "execrably scripted", "limply acted" and directed "with an air of half-hearted contrivance". He also criticised its "unsynchronised dialogue".

References

External links

1960s sex comedy films
1968 comedy films
Adultery in films
British sex comedy films
1960s English-language films
Films about DJs
Films directed by Norman J. Warren
Films scored by John Scott (composer)
Films set in London
Films shot at Isleworth Studios
1960s British films